The Ohio Commission on Dispute Resolution and Conflict Management (CDR) was a state agency of Ohio, headquartered on the 24th Floor of the Riffe Center in Columbus. The commission established anti-bullying and truancy prevention programs at Ohio schools.

It was closed in 2009 in statewide budget-cuts and has not been reinstated.

References

External links

 Ohio Commission on Dispute Resolution and Conflict Management
 Ohio Commission on Dispute Resolution and Conflict Management at YouTube

State agencies of Ohio